John Thomas Fitzsimons (3 March 1915 – 3 September 1995) was a Scottish footballer who played as an outside left, and a medical doctor who acted as Celtic F.C.'s club physician for 34 years, also working for the Scotland national football team in the role.

He began his senior football career at Celtic in 1934, also training for his medical qualifications at the Anderson College of Medicine (then associated with the University of Glasgow but today an integral part of the University of Strathclyde). Due in part to his educational commitments he was only a fringe player at the Hoops (five Scottish Division One appearances in four seasons), and transferred to lower division Alloa Athletic in 1938. During World War II when the usual competitions were suspended for seven years, he switched to Clyde then Falkirk, where he made over 150 appearances in total, played on the losing side in the 1943 Southern League Cup final and was still with the Bairns when official competitions resumed in 1946, though by the end of that year he had signed for Hamilton Academical, soon making a return to Clyde before retiring from playing in 1948.

In his medical career, Fitzsimons worked at Belvidere Hospital (Parkhead) then as a GP in his native Glasgow. In 1953 he was appointed as Celtic's club doctor, a position he held until 1987 spanning the highly successful period under manager Jock Stein. He had a similar occasional role with the Scottish international squad from 1970 to 1982, accompanying them to three FIFA World Cup finals tournaments. He was made a Knight of the Order of St. Sylvester by Pope Paul VI in 1976 for his commitment to the local Lourdes Hospitalité pilgrimage foundation.

References

Scottish footballers
1915 births
1995 deaths
Celtic F.C. players
20th-century Scottish medical doctors
Celtic F.C. non-playing staff
People educated at St Aloysius' College, Glasgow
People educated at St Joseph's College, Dumfries
Alumni of the University of Glasgow
Scottish Roman Catholics
Knights of the Order of St. Sylvester
Footballers from Glasgow
Association football outside forwards
Scottish Football League players
Scottish Junior Football Association players
St Roch's F.C. players
Clyde F.C. players
Falkirk F.C. players
Hamilton Academical F.C. players
East Fife F.C. wartime guest players
Partick Thistle F.C. wartime guest players